Zilgibis was a ruler of the North Caucasian Huns.

He received gifts from the Byzantine emperor Justin I, with whom he made a treaty against Sassanid Persia. However, the Sassanid king Kavad I also sent an embassy to him, and he also made a treaty with him. He eventually opted to side with the Persians, sending 20,000 from his troops to their aid. Upon hearing this, Justin informed Kavad that Zilgibis had also sworn alliance to him. He advised they become friends. Kavad agreed and had the Hun king and his troops killed.

References

Hunnic rulers
6th-century deaths
6th-century rulers in Europe
People of the Roman–Sasanian Wars
People executed by the Sasanian Empire
Foreign relations of the Byzantine Empire